A growth point is a technical term in cognitive linguistics and gesture research. It refers to the earliest beginnings of a spoken utterance in the mind of a speaker, combining the beginnings of a mimetic gesture with the preliminary verbal expression of the person's thought.

References

Psycholinguistics
Cognitive linguistics